The canton of Moirans-en-Montagne is an administrative division of the Jura department, eastern France. Its borders were modified at the French canton reorganisation which came into effect in March 2015. Its seat is in Moirans-en-Montagne.

It consists of the following communes:
 
Alièze
Arinthod
Aromas
Beffia
La Boissière
Cernon
Chambéria
Chancia
Charchilla
Charnod
Châtel-de-Joux
Chavéria
Condes
Cornod
Courbette
Coyron
Crenans
Les Crozets
Dompierre-sur-Mont
Dramelay
Écrille
Étival
Genod
Jeurre
Lect
Maisod
Marigna-sur-Valouse
Marnézia
Martigna
Mérona
Meussia
Moirans-en-Montagne
Montcusel
Moutonne
Nancuise
Onoz
Orgelet
Pimorin
Plaisia
Présilly
Reithouse
Rothonay
Saint-Hymetière-sur-Valouse
Sarrogna
Thoirette-Coisia
La Tour-du-Meix
Valzin en Petite Montagne
Vescles
Villards-d'Héria
Vosbles-Valfin

References

Cantons of Jura (department)